Street Justice is an American action crime drama series starring Carl Weathers and Bryan Genesse. The series began airing in syndication in 1991, and was canceled in 1993 after 2 seasons.

Synopsis
The series revolves around U.S. Army Special Forces Soldier-turned-metropolitan police detective, Adam Beaudreaux (Weathers) (b. 1948), and Grady Jameson (Genesse), a Canadian martial arts expert. As a child, Grady saved Adam's life when he was wounded-in-action during the Vietnam War. Grady's parents, who were Canadian missionaries, were killed when the Viet Cong burned down their village. After the encounter, the two formed a bond and were together in Vietnam for 10 months until Adam was sent back to the United States and discharged from service. Adam promised Grady that he would come back for him. In 1972, Adam became a police officer and began a 20-year search for the boy who had saved his life. In the intervening years, Grady was forced to steal to survive on the mean streets in Vietnam.  He was eventually arrested and imprisoned for  years.  Grady learned martial arts in prison in order to stay alive.  Adam and Grady are finally reunited in 1991 when Grady finds his way to the U.S. and shows up at Adam's place while in pursuit of the man he holds responsible for his parents' murder.

Adam puts Grady to work at the bar he co-owns with his friend, Malloy (Charlene Fernetz), the daughter of his deceased partner. Grady soon begins helping Adam on cases using the knowledge he picked up living on the streets along with his martial arts training.

Cast

Main
Carl Weathers as Adam Beaudreaux
Bryan Genesse as Grady Jameson
Charlene Fernetz as Malloy
Marcus Chong as Miguel Mendez (Season 2; guest appearances in Season 1)

Recurring
Eric McCormack as Detective Eric Rothman (18 episodes)
Janne Mortil as Detective Tricia Kelsey
Ken Tremblett as Detective Paul Schuham (11 episodes)
Leam Blackwood as Lt. Charles Pine

Guest stars

Notes
Marcus Chong and Carrie-Anne Moss would reunite years later in The Matrix.

Episodes

Season 1 (1991–92)

Season 2 (1992–93)

Home media
Visual Entertainment has released both seasons of Street Justice on DVD in Canada.

On March 22, 2011, VEI released Street Justice: The Complete Series on DVD in Canada.  The 10-disc boxset features all 43 episodes of the series.

Awards and nominations
Chicago International Film Festival
Won: Best Direction, Dramatic Series, David Winning (for episode 1.13 "Parenthood", 1993)

References

External links

August 2000 interview with series director David Winning

1991 American television series debuts
1993 American television series endings
1990s American crime drama television series
American action television series
First-run syndicated television programs in the United States
Martial arts television series
Television series by Stephen J. Cannell Productions
Television shows filmed in Vancouver
English-language television shows